Lisdowney is a townland in County  Kilkenny, Ireland. It lies on the River Nore near Ballyragget and is home to Lisdowney GAA club. The townland is in the civil parish of Aharney, within the historical barony of Galmoy, and in the electoral division of Lisdowney. As of the 2011 census, Lisdowney townland had a population of 93 people.

History 
Evidence of ancient settlement in the townland include recorded ringfort, fulacht fiadh and fortified house sites. Lisdowney's Roman Catholic church is dedicated to Saint Brigid and was built in 1840.

Amenities and sport 
 
The national (primary) school which serves the area, Lisdowney National School, had an enrollment of 98 pupils in 2022.

The local Gaelic Athletic Association club is Lisdowney GAA. Hurling and camogie teams, representing the club, won the All-Ireland Senior Club Camogie Championship in 1994, and the Kilkenny Intermediate Hurling Championship in 2020. Ted Carroll, Angela Downey and Ann Downey are former Lisdowney club members.

Geography 
 
It is in north County Kilkenny near the border with County Laois.

A wind farm, comprising four turbines generating 9.2 Megawatts, is located in the area.

References

Townlands of County Kilkenny